Angie Chiu (born 15 November 1954) is a Hong Kong actress, and was the third runner up in the 1973 Miss Hong Kong pageant.

Early life 
In 1954, Chiu was born in Hong Kong.   In 1971, Chiu graduated from Shung Tak Catholic English College and later worked as a flight attendant at Japan Airlines. In 1973, Chiu participated in the first Miss Hong Kong contest organized by TVB and won the third runner-up.

Career 
Chiu started her career as a flight attendant for Japan Airline.

In 1973, Chiu participated in Miss Hong Kong Pageant.

In 1970s, Chiu's acting career began. Chiu is most noted for her leading role in The Heaven Sword And Dragon Saber, Chor Lau Heung, The Bund, opposite Chow Yun-fat and Lui Leung-Wai.

Chiu is a well known actress in Hong Kong, Taiwan, Macau and Mainland China.

Personal life 
In 1975, Chiu married Wong Hon-wai (黃漢偉), a medical doctor. They had two children, Gary Wong (黃光宏) and Ronnie Wong (黃光宜). In 1983, Chiu divorced Wong Hon-wai. 
In 1984, Chiu married Melvin Wong, an actor. On 7 January 1986, their son Wesley Wong (黃愷傑) was born.
Chiu's son Wesley later became an actor.

Filmography

Film 
This is a partial list of films.

Television series

Awards & titles
Miss Hong Kong Pageant 1973 Third Runner-up
TVB Anniversary Awards 1999 All-Time Most Memorable Female Leading Role  ~ The Bund

See also 
 Miss Hong Kong Pageant#Summary of winners

References

External links

 Angie Chiu at hkcinemagic.com
 Angie Chiu at senscritique.com
 Angie Chiu at dianying.com
 Angie Chiu at rottentomatoes.com
 Angie Chiu at misshongkongpageant.com
 Angie Chiu at go.asia

TVB actors
Living people
1954 births
Hong Kong film actresses
Hong Kong television actresses